Menstruation (also known as a period, among other colloquial terms) is the regular discharge of blood and mucosal tissue from the inner lining of the uterus through the vagina. The menstrual cycle is characterized by the rise and fall of hormones. Menstruation is triggered by falling progesterone levels and is a sign that pregnancy has not occurred.

The first period, a point in time known as menarche, usually begins between the ages of 12 and 15. Menstruation starting as young as 8 years would still be considered normal. The average age of the first period is generally later in the developing world, and earlier in the developed world. The typical length of time between the first day of one period and the first day of the next is 21 to 45 days in young women. In adults, the range is between 21 and 31 days with the average being 28 days. Bleeding usually lasts around 2 to 7 days. Periods stop during pregnancy and typically do not resume during the initial months of breastfeeding. Menstruation, and with it the possibility of pregnancy, ceases after menopause, which usually occurs between 45 and 55 years of age.

Up to 80% of women do not experience problems sufficient to disrupt daily functioning either during menstruation or in the days leading up to menstruation. Symptoms in advance of menstruation that do interfere with normal life are called premenstrual syndrome (PMS). Some 20 to 30% of women experience PMS, with 3 to 8% experiencing severe symptoms. These include acne, tender breasts, bloating, feeling tired, irritability, and mood changes. Other symptoms some women experience include painful periods and heavy bleeding during menstruation and abnormal bleeding at any time during the menstrual cycle. A lack of periods, known as amenorrhea, is when periods do not occur by age 15 or have not re-occurred in 90 days.

Characteristics

Length and duration
The first menstrual period occurs after the onset of pubertal growth, and is called menarche. The average age of menarche is 12 to 15 years. However, it may occur as early as eight. The average age of the first period is generally later in the developing world, and earlier in the developed world. The average age of menarche has changed little in the United States since the 1950s.

Menstruation is the most visible phase of the menstrual cycle and its beginning is used as the marker between cycles. The first day of menstrual bleeding is the date used for the last menstrual period (LMP). The typical length of time between the first day of one period and the first day of the next is 21 to 45 days in young women, and 21 to 31 days in adults. The average length is 28 days; one study estimated it at 29.3 days. The variability of menstrual cycle lengths is highest for women under 25 years of age and is lowest, that is, most regular, for ages 25 to 39 years. The variability increases slightly for women aged 40 to 44 years.

Perimenopause is when a woman's fertility declines, and menstruation occurs less regularly in the years leading up to the final menstrual period, when a woman stops menstruating completely and is no longer fertile. The medical definition of menopause is one year without a period and typically occurs between 45 and 55 years in Western countries. Menopause before age 45 is considered premature in industrialized countries. Like the age of menarche, the age of menopause is largely a result of cultural and biological factors. Illnesses, certain surgeries, or medical treatments may cause menopause to occur earlier than it might have otherwise.

Bleeding

Menstrual fluid is the correct name for the flow, although many people prefer to refer to it as menstrual blood. Menstrual fluid is reddish-brown, a slightly darker color than venous blood.

About half of menstrual fluid is blood. This blood contains sodium, calcium, phosphate, iron, and chloride, the extent of which depends on the woman. As well as blood, the fluid consists of cervical mucus, vaginal secretions, and endometrial tissue. Vaginal fluids in menses mainly contribute water, common electrolytes, organ moieties, and at least 14 proteins, including glycoproteins.

Many women and girls notice blood clots during menstruation. These appear as clumps of blood that may look like tissue. If there was a miscarriage or a stillbirth, examination under a microscope can confirm if it was endometrial tissue or pregnancy tissue (products of conception) that was shed. Sometimes menstrual clots or shed endometrial tissue is incorrectly thought to indicate an early-term miscarriage of an embryo. An enzyme called plasmin – contained in the endometrium – tends to inhibit the blood from clotting.

The amount of iron lost in menstrual fluid is relatively small for most women. In one study, premenopausal women who exhibited symptoms of iron deficiency were given endoscopies. 86% of them actually had gastrointestinal disease and were at risk of being misdiagnosed simply because they were menstruating. Heavy menstrual bleeding, occurring monthly, can result in anemia.

Hormonal changes

Side effects

Menstrual health overview

Moods and premenstrual syndrome (PMS)

Cramps
In most women, various physical changes are brought about by fluctuations in hormone levels during the menstrual cycle. This includes muscle contractions of the uterus (menstrual cramping) that can precede or accompany menstruation. Many women experience painful cramps, also known as dysmenorrhea, during menstruation. Among adult women, that pain is severe enough to affect daily activity in only 2%–28%. Severe symptoms that disrupt daily activities and functioning may be diagnosed as premenstrual dysphoric disorder. These symptoms can be severe enough to affect a person's performance at work, school, and in everyday activities in a small percentage of women.

When severe pelvic pain and bleeding suddenly occur or worsen during a cycle, this could be due to ectopic pregnancy and spontaneous abortion. This is checked by using a pregnancy test, ideally as soon as unusual pain begins, because ectopic pregnancies can be life‑threatening.

The most common treatment for menstrual cramps are non-steroidal anti-inflammatory drugs (NSAIDs). NSAIDs can be used to reduce moderate to severe pain, and all appear similar. About 1 in 5 women do not respond to NSAIDs and require alternative therapy, such as simple analgesics or heat pads. Other medications for pain management include aspirin or paracetamol and combined oral contraceptives. Although combined oral contraceptives may be used, there is insufficient evidence for the efficacy of intrauterine progestogens.

One review found tentative evidence that acupuncture may be useful, at least in the short term. Another review found insufficient evidence to determine an effect.

Interactions with other conditions 
Known interactions between the menstrual cycle and certain health conditions include:

 Some women with neurological conditions experience increased activity of their conditions at about the same time during each menstrual cycle. For example, drops in estrogen levels may trigger migraines,  especially when the woman who has migraines is also taking the birth control pill.
 Many women with epilepsy have more seizures in a pattern linked to the menstrual cycle; this is called "catamenial epilepsy". Different patterns seem to exist (such as seizures coinciding with the time of menstruation, or coinciding with the time of ovulation), and the frequency with which they occur has not been firmly established.
 Research indicates that women have a significantly higher likelihood of anterior cruciate ligament injuries in the pre-ovulatory stage, than post-ovulatory stage.

Sexual activity 

Sexual feelings and behaviors change during the menstrual cycle. Before and during ovulation, high levels of estrogen and androgens result in women having a relatively increased interest in sexual activity, and relatively lower interest directly prior to and during menstruation. Unlike other mammals, women may show interest in sexual activity across all days of the menstrual cycle, regardless of fertility.

There is no reliable scientific evidence that would advise against sexual intercourse during menstruation based on medical grounds.

Fertility aspects 
Peak fertility (the time with the highest likelihood of pregnancy resulting from sexual intercourse) occurs during just a few days of the cycle: usually two days before and two days after the ovulation date. This corresponds to the second and the beginning of the third week in a 28-day cycle. This fertile window varies from woman to woman, just as the ovulation date often varies from cycle to cycle for the same woman. A variety of methods have been developed to help individual women estimate the relatively fertile and the relatively infertile days in the cycle; these systems are called fertility awareness.

Menstrual disorders 

Infrequent or irregular ovulation is called oligoovulation. The absence of ovulation is called anovulation. Normal menstrual flow can occur without ovulation preceding it: an anovulatory cycle. In some cycles, follicular development may start but not be completed; nevertheless, estrogens will be formed and stimulate the uterine lining. Anovulatory flow resulting from a very thick endometrium caused by prolonged, continued high estrogen levels is called estrogen breakthrough bleeding. Anovulatory bleeding triggered by a sudden drop in estrogen levels is called withdrawal bleeding. Anovulatory cycles commonly occur before menopause (perimenopause) and in women with polycystic ovary syndrome.

Very little flow (less than 10 ml) is called hypomenorrhea. Regular cycles with intervals of 21 days or fewer are polymenorrhea; frequent but irregular menstruation is known as metrorrhagia. Sudden heavy flows or amounts greater than 80 ml are termed menorrhagia. Heavy menstruation that occurs frequently and irregularly is menometrorrhagia. The term for cycles with intervals exceeding 35 days is oligomenorrhea. Amenorrhea refers to more than three to six months without menses (while not being pregnant) during a woman's reproductive years. The term for painful periods is dysmenorrhea.

There is a wide spectrum of differences in how women experience menstruation. There are several ways that someone's menstrual cycle can differ from the norm:

Extreme psychological stress can also result in periods stopping. More severe symptoms of anxiety or depression may be signs of premenstrual dysphoric disorder (PMDD) with is a depressive disorder.

Dysfunctional uterine bleeding is a hormonally caused bleeding abnormality.  Dysfunctional uterine bleeding typically occurs in premenopausal women who do not ovulate normally (i.e. are anovulatory). All these bleeding abnormalities need medical attention; they may indicate hormone imbalances, uterine fibroids, or other problems. As pregnant women may bleed, a pregnancy test forms part of the evaluation of abnormal bleeding.

Women who had undergone female genital mutilation (particularly type III- infibulation)  a practice common in parts of Africa, may experience menstrual problems, such as slow and painful menstruation, that is caused by the near-complete sealing off of the vagina.

Dysmenorrhea

Menstrual hygiene management 

Menstrual products (also called "feminine hygiene" products) are made to absorb or catch menstrual blood. A number of different products are available – some are disposable, some are reusable. Where women can afford it, items used to absorb or catch menses are usually commercially manufactured products. Menstruating women manage menstruation primarily by wearing menstrual products such as tampons, napkins or menstrual cups to catch the menstrual blood.

The main disposable products (commercially manufactured) include:
Sanitary napkins (also called sanitary towels or pads) – Rectangular pieces of material worn attached to the underwear to absorb menstrual flow, often with an adhesive backing to hold the pad in place. Disposable pads may contain wood pulp or gel products, usually with a plastic lining and bleached.
Tampons – Disposable cylinders of treated rayon/cotton blends or all-cotton fleece, usually bleached, that are inserted into the vagina to absorb menstrual flow.

The main reusable products include:
Menstrual cups – A firm, flexible bell-shaped device worn inside the vagina to collect menstrual flow. 
Reusable cloth pads – Pads that are made of cotton (often organic), terrycloth, or flannel, and may be handsewn (from material or reused old clothes and towels) or storebought.
Padded panties or period-proof underwear – Reusable cloth (usually cotton) underwear with extra absorbent layers sewn in to absorb flow. 
Due to poverty, some women cannot afford commercial feminine hygiene products. Instead, they use materials found in the environment or other improvised materials. "Period poverty" is a global issue affecting women and girls who do not have access to safe, hygienic sanitary products. In addition, solid waste disposal systems in developing countries are often lacking, which means women have no proper place to dispose used products, such as pads. Inappropriate disposal of used materials also creates pressures on sanitation systems as menstrual hygiene products can create blockages of toilets, pipes and sewers.

Menstrual suppression

Due to hormonal contraception

Menstruation can be delayed by the use of progesterone or progestins. For this purpose, oral administration of progesterone or progestin during cycle day 20 has been found to effectively delay menstruation for at least 20 days, with menstruation starting after 2–3 days have passed since discontinuing the regimen.

Hormonal contraception affects the frequency, duration, severity, volume, and regularity of menstruation and menstrual symptoms. The most common form of hormonal contraception is the combined birth control pill, which contains both estrogen and progestogen. Although the primary function of the pill is to prevent pregnancy, it may be used to improve some menstrual symptoms and syndromes which affect menstruation, such as polycystic ovary syndrome (PCOS), endometriosis, adenomyosis, amenorrhea, menstrual cramps, menstrual migraines, menorrhagia (excessive menstrual bleeding), menstruation-related or fibroid-related anemia and dysmenorrhea (painful menstruation) by creating regularity in menstrual cycles and reducing overall menstrual flow.

Using the combined birth control pill, it is also possible for a woman to delay or eliminate menstrual periods, a practice called menstrual suppression. Some women do this simply for convenience in the short-term, while others prefer to eliminate periods altogether when possible. This can be done either by skipping the placebo pills, or using an extended cycle combined oral contraceptive pill, which were first marketed in the U.S. in the early 2000s. This continuous administration of active pills without the placebo can lead to the achievement of amenorrhea in 80% of users within 1 year of use.

Due to breastfeeding 

Breastfeeding causes negative feedback to occur on pulse secretion of gonadotropin-releasing hormone (GnRH) and luteinizing hormone (LH). Depending on the strength of the negative feedback, breastfeeding women may experience complete suppression of follicular development, follicular development but no ovulation, or normal menstrual cycles may resume. Suppression of ovulation is more likely when suckling occurs more frequently. The production of prolactin in response to suckling is important to maintaining lactational amenorrhea. On average, women who are fully breastfeeding whose infants suckle frequently experience a return of menstruation at fourteen and a half months postpartum. There is a wide range of response among individual breastfeeding women, however, with some experiencing return of menstruation at two months and others remaining amenorrheic for up to 42 months postpartum.

Society and culture

Etymology and terminology 
The word menstruation is etymologically related to moon. The terms menstruation and menses are derived from the Latin  , which in turn relates to the ancient Greek   and to the roots of the English words month and moon.

Some organizations have begun to use the term "menstruator" instead of "menstruating women", a term that has been in use since at least 2010. Menstruator is used by some activists and scholars in order to "express solidarity with women who do not menstruate, transgender men who do, and intersexual and genderqueer individuals". However, use of the term has also been criticized by some feminists who consider sex differences important and the term woman to be necessary to resist patriarchy. The term "people who menstruate" is also used.

Traditions, taboos and education 

Many religions have menstruation-related traditions, for example: Islam prohibits sexual contact with women during menstruation in the 2nd chapter of the Quran. Some scholars argue that menstruating women are in a state in which they are unable to maintain wudhu, and are therefore prohibited from touching the Arabic version of the Qur'an. Other biological and involuntary functions such as vomiting, bleeding, sexual intercourse, and going to the bathroom also invalidate one's wudhu. In Judaism, a woman during menstruation is called Niddah and may be banned from certain actions. For example, the Jewish Torah prohibits sexual intercourse with a menstruating woman. In Hinduism, menstruating women are traditionally considered ritually impure and given rules to follow.

Menstruation education is frequently taught in combination with sex education at school in Western countries, although girls may prefer their mothers to be the primary source of information about menstruation and puberty. Information about menstruation is often shared among friends and peers, which may promote a more positive outlook on puberty. The quality of menstrual education in a society determines the accuracy of people's understanding of the process. In many Western countries where menstruation is a taboo subject, girls tend to conceal the fact that they may be menstruating and struggle to ensure that they give no sign of menstruation. Effective educational programs are essential to providing children and adolescents with clear and accurate information about menstruation. Schools can be an appropriate place for menstrual education to take place. Programs led by peers or third-party agencies are another option. Low-income girls are less likely to receive proper sex education on puberty, leading to a decreased understanding of why menstruation occurs and the associated physiological changes that take place. This has been shown to cause the development of a negative attitude towards menstruation.

Seclusion during menstruation 

In some cultures, women were isolated during menstruation due to menstrual taboos. This is because they are seen as unclean, dangerous, or bringing bad luck to those who encounter them. These practices are common in parts of South Asia including India. A 1983 report found women refraining  from household chore during this period in India. Chhaupadi is a social practice that occurs in the western part of Nepal for Hindu women, which prohibits a woman from participating in everyday activities during menstruation. Women are considered impure during this time and are kept out of the house and have to live in a shed. Although chhaupadi was outlawed by the Supreme Court of Nepal in 2005, the tradition is slow to change. Women and girls in cultures which practice such seclusion are often confined to menstruation huts, which are places of isolation used by cultures with strong menstrual taboos. The practice has recently come under fire due to related fatalities. Nepal criminalized the practice in 2017 after deaths were reported after the elongated isolation periods, but "the practice of isolating menstruating women and girls continues."

Beliefs around synchrony

Effects of the moon 

Even though the average length of the human menstrual cycle is similar to that of the lunar cycle, in modern humans there is no relation between the two. The relationship is believed to be a coincidence. Light exposure does not appear to affect the menstrual cycle in humans. A meta-analysis of studies from 1996 showed no correlation between the human menstrual cycle and the lunar cycle, nor did data analyzed by period-tracking app Clue, submitted by 1.5million women, of 7.5million menstrual cycles, however the lunar cycle and the average menstrual cycle were found to be basically equal in length.

Cohabitation 
Beginning in 1971, some research suggested that menstrual cycles of cohabiting women became synchronized (menstrual synchrony). Subsequent research has called this hypothesis into question. A 2013 review concluded that menstrual synchrony likely does not exist.

Work 
Some countries, mainly in Asia, have menstrual leave to provide women with either paid or unpaid leave of absence from their employment while they are menstruating. Countries with policies include Japan, Taiwan, Indonesia, and South Korea. The practice is controversial due to concerns that it bolsters the perception of women as weak, inefficient workers, as well as concerns that it is unfair to men, and that it furthers gender stereotypes and the medicalization of menstruation.

Other mammals 

Most female mammals have an estrous cycle, but not all have a menstrual cycle that results in menstruation. Menstruation in mammals occurs in some close evolutionary relatives such as chimpanzees.

See also 
 Niddah (Jewish laws of menstruation)

References

Book sources

External links 
 
 

Menstrual cycle
Wikipedia medicine articles ready to translate
Midwifery